Acehnese may refer to:

 Acehnese people
 Acehnese language

See also

 Aceh

Language and nationality disambiguation pages